Weyl's tube formula gives the volume of an object defined as the set of all points within a small distance of a manifold.

Let  be an oriented, closed, two-dimensional surface, and let  denote the set of all points within a distance  of the surface .

This expression can be generalized to the case where  is a -dimensional submanifold of -dimensional Euclidean space .

References 

Manifolds